The UEFA qualifying competition for the 2016 FIFA Futsal World Cup was a men's futsal competition that determined the seven European national teams taking part in the final tournament in Colombia.

The national teams from a total of 45 UEFA member associations entered the qualifying competition. Denmark, Gibraltar, Sweden and Wales made their FIFA Futsal World Cup qualifying debuts.

Format
The qualifying competition consisted of three rounds:
Preliminary round: The 23 lowest-ranked teams were drawn into five groups of four teams and one group of three teams. Each group was played in single round-robin format at one of the teams which were pre-selected as hosts (if a group was drawn without pre-selected hosts, the hosts were selected afterwards by agreement or draw by UEFA). The six group winners advanced to the main round.
Main round: The 28 teams (22 highest-ranked teams and six preliminary round qualifiers) were drawn into seven groups of four teams. Each group was played in single round-robin format at one of the teams which were pre-selected as hosts. The seven group winners and the seven runners-up advanced to the play-offs.
Play-offs: The 14 teams were drawn into seven ties to play home-and-away two-legged matches to determine the seven qualified teams.

Tiebreakers
In the preliminary round and main round, the teams were ranked according to points (3 points for a win, 1 point for a draw, 0 points for a loss). If two or more teams were equal on points on completion of a mini-tournament, the following tie-breaking criteria were applied, in the order given, to determine the rankings:
Higher number of points obtained in the mini-tournament matches played among the teams in question;
Superior goal difference resulting from the mini-tournament matches played among the teams in question;
Higher number of goals scored in the mini-tournament matches played among the teams in question;
If, after having applied criteria 1 to 3, teams still had an equal ranking, criteria 1 to 3 were reapplied exclusively to the mini-tournament matches between the teams in question to determine their final rankings. If this procedure did not lead to a decision, criteria 5 to 10 applied;
Superior goal difference in all mini-tournament matches;
Higher number of goals scored in all mini-tournament matches;
If only two teams had the same number of points, and they were tied according to criteria 1 to 6 after having met in the last round of the mini-tournament, their rankings were determined by a penalty shoot-out (not used if more than two teams had the same number of points, or if their rankings were not relevant for qualification for the next stage).
Lower disciplinary points total based only on yellow and red cards received in the mini-tournament matches (red card = 3 points, yellow card = 1 point, expulsion for two yellow cards in one match = 3 points);
Coefficient ranking;
Drawing of lots.

In the play-offs, the team that scored more goals on aggregate over the two legs qualified for the final tournament. If the aggregate score was level, the away goals rule was applied, i.e., the team that scored more goals away from home over the two legs advanced. If away goals were also equal, extra time was played. The away goals rule was again applied after extra time, i.e., if there were goals scored during extra time and the aggregate score was still level, the visiting team advanced by virtue of more away goals scored. If no goals were scored during extra time, the tie was decided by penalty shoot-out.

Schedule
The qualifying matches were played on the following dates.

Entrants
The teams were ranked according to their coefficient ranking, calculated based on the following:
UEFA Futsal Euro 2012 final tournament and qualifying competition
2012 FIFA Futsal World Cup final tournament and qualifying competition
UEFA Futsal Euro 2014 final tournament and qualifying competition

The 22 highest-ranked teams entered the main round, while the 23 lowest-ranked teams entered the preliminary round. The coefficient ranking was also used for seeding in the preliminary round and main round draws.

Notes
Iceland (Coeff: 0.222; Rank 41), Republic of Ireland (Coeff: 0.000; Rank 47), Austria (no rank), Faroe Islands (no rank), Germany (no rank), Liechtenstein (no rank), Luxembourg (no rank), Northern Ireland (no rank), and Scotland (no rank) did not enter.
Gibraltar entered despite being a non-FIFA member and thus ineligible for the World Cup.
Teams which were pre-selected as preliminary round or main round hosts were denoted by (H). As only three teams were pre-selected as preliminary round hosts, three preliminary round groups were drawn without pre-selected hosts, and the hosts would be selected afterwards by agreement or draw by UEFA.

The draws for the preliminary round and main round were held on 2 July 2015, 14:30 CEST (UTC+2), at the UEFA headquarters in Nyon, Switzerland. Each group in the preliminary round and main round contained one team from each of the seeding positions 1–4, except for one group in the preliminary round which contained one team from each of the seeding positions 1–3. The six teams which qualified from the preliminary round, whose identity was not known at the time of the draw, were placed in seeding position 4 for the main round draw. In the preliminary round draw, the teams which were pre-selected as hosts could not be drawn in the same group, while in the main round draw, the teams which were pre-selected as hosts were drawn from a separate pot, while being placed in their groups according to their seeding positions.

Preliminary round
Times were CEST (UTC+2), except for matches on 25 October 2015 which were CET (UTC+1).

Group A

Group B

Group C

Group D

Group E

Group F

Main round
All times were CET (UTC+1).

Group 1

Group 2

Group 3

Group 4

Group 5

Group 6

Group 7

Play-offs
The draw for the play-offs was held on 12 February 2016, 12:00 CET (UTC+1), at the Crowne Plaza Hotel in Belgrade, Serbia. The seven group winners were seeded, and the seven group runners-up were unseeded. The seeded teams were paired with the unseeded teams, with the former hosting the second leg. Teams from the same main round group could not be drawn against each other.

Seeding

Summary

|}

Matches
The first legs were played on 22 March, and the second legs were played on 12 and 13 April 2016. Times were CET (UTC+1) for first legs, and CEST (UTC+2) for second legs.

Spain won 5–2 on aggregate and qualified for the final tournament.

Ukraine won 11–1 on aggregate and qualified for the final tournament.

Kazakhstan won 8–1 on aggregate and qualified for the final tournament.

Portugal won 4–2 on aggregate and qualified for the final tournament.

Russia won 6–3 on aggregate and qualified for the final tournament.

Azerbaijan won 9–5 on aggregate and qualified for the final tournament.

Italy won 9–0 on aggregate and qualified for the final tournament.

Qualified teams
The following seven teams from UEFA qualified for the final tournament:

1 Bold indicates champion for that year. Italic indicates host for that year.
2 Kazakhstan qualified as a member of the AFC in 2000.

Goalscorers
8 goals

 Fernando Cardinal

7 goals

 Eduardo

6 goals

 Vitaliy Borisov
 Cristian Obadă
 Dan Mönell

5 goals

 Amadeu
 Mads Falck
 Stuart Cook
 Giorgi Tikurishvili
 Alex Merlim
 Maksims Seņs
 Oleg Hilotii
 Milovan Drašković
 Miguelín
 Mykhailo Grytsyna

4 goals

 Aleksandr Chernik
 Sergei Silivonchik
 Kamel Hamdoud
 Abdessamad Mohammed
 Serik Zhamankulov
 Andrian Laşcu
 Andrei Negara
 Tomasz Kriezel
 Fábio Cecílio
 Robinho
 Jesús Aicardo
 Álex Yepes
 Yevgen Valenko
 Serhiy Zhurba

3 goals

 Azem Brahimi
 Roald Halimi
 Carlos Barbosa
 Augusto
 Fineo De Araujo
 Tomo Bevanda
 Josip Suton
 Markos Ioannou
 Michal Mareš
 Jacob Jensen
 Raoni Medina
 Richard Ward
 Miika Hosio
 Juhana Jyrkiäinen
 Azdine Aigoun
 Adrien Gasmi
 Irakli Todua
 János Rábl
 Douglas Júnior
 Dauren Nurgozhin
 Yotam Bliech
 Adam Cohen
 Alessandro Patias
 Sergio Romano
 Oskars Ikstēns
 Adrijan Micevski
 Alexei Munteanu
 Tevfik Ceyar
 Bartłomiej Nawrat
 Ricardinho
 Eder Lima
 Raúl Campos
 Mladen Kocić
 Igor Osredkar
 Sargon Abraham
 Kristian Legiec
 Volodymyr Razuvanov
 Yevgen Rogachov
 Rico Zulkarnain

2 goals

 Gentian Begaj
 Nacho Llamas
 Aleksandr Olshevski
 Sergei Shostak
 Omar Rahou
 Jakov Grcić
 Franko Jelovčić
 Dario Marinović
 Vedran Matošević
 Kostas Antreou
 Costas Kouloumbris
 Rasmus Johansson
 Kevin Jørgensen
 Ian Parkes
 Kristjan Paapsi
 Vladislav Tšurilkin
 Panu Autio
 Sid Belhaj
 Vakhtangi Jvarashvili
 Murtaz Kakabadze
 Zurab Lukava
 Gia Nikvashvili
 Andrew Lopez
 Apostolos Gkaifyllias
 Zoltán Dróth
 Ádám Hosszú
 Péter Németh
 Mauro Canal
 Rodolfo Fortino
 Leo Jaraguá
 Chingiz Yesenamanov
 Andrejs Aleksejevs
 Igors Dacko
 Artjoms Koļesņikovs
 Igor Leovski
 Jovica Milijic
 Mohamed Attaibi
 Zaid El Morabiti
 Marcin Mikołajewicz
 Tiago Brito
 Djô
 Marius Matei
 Sergei Abramov
 Dmitri Lyskov
 Rômulo
 Matteo Michelotti
 Marko Perić
 Slobodan Rajčević
 Marek Belaník
 Tomáš Drahovský
 Rok Mordej
 Adolfo
 Bebe
 Pola
 Mario Rivillos
 Hanna Abraham
 Mathias Eteus
 Ihor Borsuk
 Sergiy Koval
 Denys Ovsyannikov
 Petro Shoturma
 Chris Hugh
 Tyrell Webbe

1 goal

 Almir Hasaj
 Rej Karaja
 Mentor Mejzini
 Armen Babayan
 Henrik Grigoryan
 Vardan Gukasyan
 Grigor Kapukranyan
 Garegin Mashumyan
 Sargis Nasibyan
 Ramiz Chovdarov
 Sergey Chuykov
 Rizvan Farzaliyev
 Rafael
 Oleg Gorbenko
 Aleksei Popov
 Ibrahim Adnane
 Valentin Dujacquier
 Lúcio
 Jawad Yachou
 Hamza Zaaf
 Ivan Matan
 Nijaz Mulahmetović
 Dejan Pavlović
 Anel Radmilović
 Marin Šunjić
 Daniel Nestorov
 Yosif Shutev
 Kristijan Grbeša
 Manolis Manoli
 David Cupák
 Michal Seidler
 Radim Záruba
 Rasmus Lørup Arildsen
 Louis Veis
 William Gay
 Agon Rexha
 Maksim Aleksejev
 Sergei Korsunov
 Joni Pakola
 Antti Teittinen
 Samir Alla
 Boumedyen Bensaber
 Réda Rabei
 Kevin Ramirez
 Tornike Bukia
 Levan Kobaidze
 Kakhaber Maisaia
 Lasha Sigunava
 Joseph Chipol
 Ivan Robba
 Jamie Walker
 Vasilis Asimakopoulos
 Petros Katevtsian
 Spyridon Kondylatos
 Kostas Malovits
 Andreas Mantis
 Kostas Panou
 Richárd Dávid
 Norbert Horváth
 Bence Klacsák
 Szabolcs Szeghy
 Yoav Hagbi
 Asif-Yosef Sabag
 Gabriel Lima
 Japa
 Kaká
 Vinícius dos Santos
 Leo Higuita
 Arnold Knaub
 Dinmukhambet Suleimenov
 Jurijs Arhipovs-Prokofjevs
 Igors Avanesovs
 Andrejs Šustrovs
 Vaidas Garšvinskas
 Jurij Jeremejev
 Rolandas Leščius
 Deividas Stradalovas
 Aleksandar Gligorov
 Daniel Marinho de Souza
 Dragan Petrović
 Andy Mangion
 Dylan Musu
 Xavier Saliba
 Luke Stivala
 Constantin Burdujel
 Sergiu Tacot
 Alexandr Ţîmbalist
 Bojan Bajović
 Saša Gojković
 Semir Gurzaković
 Ilija Mugoša
 Jeroen de Groot
 Jamal El Ghannouti
 Karim Mossaoui
 Yoshua St Juste
 Mats Velseboer
 Mathias Dahl Abelsen
 Omar Fonstad
 Dennis Obeng
 Erlend Skaga
 Rafał Franz
 Daniel Krawczyk
 Michał Kubik
 Mikołaj Zastawnik
 Fábio Lima
 João Matos
 Vlad Iancu
 Emil Răducu
 Dumitru Stoica
 Artem Antoshkin
 Danil Kutuzov
 Ivan Milovanov
 Nikolai Pereverzev
 Renat Shakirov
 Raffaele Barducci
 Michele Moretti
 Elia Pasqualini
 Stefan Rakić
 Darko Ristić
 Miloš Stojković
 Martin Doša
 Vladimír Papajčík
 Dušan Rafaj
 Kristjan Čujec
 Alen Fetić
 Anže Širok
 Gašper Vrhovec
 Fernandão
 Lin
 Carlos Ortiz
 Niklas Asp
 Patrik Burda
 Simon Chekroun
 Albert Hiseni
 Dana Kuhi
 Yves Mezger
 Mato Sego
 Yasin Erdal
 Cem Keskin
 Cihan Özcan
 Mykola Grytsyna
 Vitaliy Kiselyov
 Lloyd Jenkins
 Simon Prangley

1 own goal

 Armen Babayan (against Latvia)
 Aleksandr Olshevski (against Croatia)
 Dejan Pavlović (against Netherlands)
 Jim Jensen (against England)
 Raoni Medina (against Belgium)
 Agon Rexha (against Denmark)
 Robert Veskimäe (against Cyprus)
 Leo Jaraguá (against France)
 Jamal El Ghannouti (against Bosnia and Herzegovina)
 Mustapha Achrifi (against Romania)
 Omar Fonstad (against Poland)
 Daniil Davydov (against Serbia)
 Alper Tolgahan Aytaş (against Finland)

References

External links
Official website

2016
Uefa
qualification